Janis Kelly (born 30 December 1954) is a Scottish operatic soprano and voice teacher. She is Professor and Chair of Vocal Performance at the Royal College of Music in London.

Early life

Kelly was born in Glasgow, Scotland. She studied at the Royal Conservatoire of Scotland and the Royal College of Music. 
Following this, she studied under Elisabeth Grümmer in Paris.

Career and reception

Operatic appearances

Kelly has performed with the English National Opera for over 30 years. Her roles at the ENO have included Marcellina in Mozart's The Marriage of Figaro and Mrs Grose in Britten's The Turn of the Screw. In 2009 she starred as Régine Saint Laurent in the premiere of Prima Donna, written by Rufus Wainwright. Reviewing the performance in The Telegraph, Rupert Christiansen described Kelly as an 'amazing chameleon'. She appeared as Pat Nixon in John Adams' Nixon in China at the Metropolitan Opera in New York City in 2011. The New York Times described her performance as 'wonderful'.

Film and television

Kelly's recording  of Verdi's La traviata was featured in the 2005 Woody Allen film Match Point. Recordings by Kelly including a performance of the aria Senza Mamma from Puccini's Suor Angelica appeared on the British ITV television series Inspector Morse. She also sang the two songs for Ophelia in the Incidental Music to Tchaikovsky's Hamlet recorded for Chandos Records in 1981 with Geoffrey Simon conducting the London Symphony Orchestra.

References 

Voice teachers
Women music educators
Musicians from Glasgow
Living people
20th-century Scottish women singers
20th-century British women opera singers
21st-century Scottish women singers
21st-century British women opera singers
Alumni of the Royal Conservatoire of Scotland
Alumni of the Royal College of Music
Academics of the Royal College of Music
1954 births